The Show of Our Lives – Caravan at the BBC 1968–1975 is a double album of tracks recorded for the BBC in the period 1968–1975, for John Peel's Top Gear, amongst others by the British Canterbury scene progressive rock band Caravan.

Track listing
Disc One
"Place of My Own" – 4:12
"Ride" – 4:17
"If I Could Do It All Over Again, I'd Do It All Over You" – 2:45
"Hello, Hello" – 3:10
"As I Feel I Die" – 6:23
"Love to Love You" – 3:12
"Love Song Without Flute" – 3:33
"In The Land of Grey and Pink" – 3:43
"Nine Feet Underground" – 14:27
"Feelin' Reelin' Squealin" – 9:30
"A Huntin' We Shall Go" – 9:15
"Waffle Part One: Be Alright / Chance of a Lifetime" – 6:46

Disc Two
"Memory Lain Hugh" – 5:04
"Headloss" – 4:27
"The Love in Your Eye" – 13:54
"Mirror for the Day" – 4:15
"Virgin on the Ridiculous" – 7:01
"For Richard" – 15:04
"The Dabsong Conshirto" – 15:11
"Stuck in a Hole" – 3:14
"The Show of our Lives" – 4:54

 Tracks 1-1 and 1-2 recorded for John Peel's "Top Gear" Radio Show 31 December 1968 ("Off-Air" Recordings)
 Tracks 1-3 to 1-5 recorded for the BBC Transcription Service "Top of the Pops" 19 August 1970.
 Tracks 1-6 to 1-8 recorded for "Sounds of the Seventies" 11 March 1971.
 Tracks 1-9 and 1-10 recorded for John Peel's "Sunday Concert" at the Paris Theatre, London 6 May 1971.
 Tracks 1-11 and 1-12 recorded for the BBC "In Concert" at the Paris Theatre, London 2 August 1973.
 Tracks 2-1 and 2-2 recorded for the BBC "In Concert" at the Paris Theatre, London 2 August 1973.
 Tracks 2-3 to 2-6 recorded for John Peel's Radio Show 7 February 1974.
 Tracks 2-7 recorded for the BBC "In Concert" at the Paris Theatre, London 21 March 1975.
 Tracks 2-8 and 2-9 recorded for John Peel's Radio Show 26 June 1975.

Personnel 
 Pye Hastings – guitar, vocals
 Geoffrey Richardson – viola
 David Sinclair – keyboards
 Steve Miller – keyboards
 Jan Schelhaas – keyboards
 Richard Sinclair – bass, vocals
 Mike Wedgwood – bass
 Richard Coughlan – drums

References

External links
 Caravan - The Show of Our Lives: Caravan at the BBC 1968-1975 (2007) album credits at Discogs.com
 Caravan - The Show of Our Lives: Caravan at the BBC 1968-1975 (2007) album to be listened as stream at Play.Spotify.com

Caravan (band) live albums
2007 live albums
2007 compilation albums
Universal Records live albums
Universal Records compilation albums
Decca Records live albums
Decca Records compilation albums
Caravan (band) compilation albums
BBC Radio recordings